The Banovići Coal Mine is a brown coal mine located in Banovići, in the Tuzla Canton.  The mine consists of three surface mines: Čubrić, Turija and Grivice and the underground Omazići mine  and has coal reserves amounting to 208 million tonnes of lignite, which makes it one of the largest coal reserves in Europe and the world. The mine, which is owned and operated by RMU Banovići, has an annual production capacity of 1.27 million tonnes of coal. The coal mine used in 2014 still steam locomotives on its railway.

References 

Coal mines in Bosnia and Herzegovina
Tuzla Canton